Frederick J. Grieman is an American experimental physical chemist. He is the Roscoe Moss Professor of Chemistry at Pomona College in Claremont, California. His research interests include chemical reactions in the atmosphere that affect the concentrations of pollutants and gas-phase spectroscopy of transition metal compounds.

Early life and education
Grieman attended the University of California, Irvine. He then earned his doctorate from the University of California, Berkeley.

Career
Grieman came to Pomona College in 1982. He was the associate dean of the college from 1997 to 2000.

References

External links
Faculty page at Pomona College

20th-century American chemists
21st-century American chemists
Pomona College faculty
American physical chemists
Atmospheric chemists
University of California, Irvine alumni
University of California, Berkeley alumni

Year of birth missing (living people)
Living people